Kamakhya Pemton College, established in 1973, is a general degree college in Hiyangthang, Imphal, Manipur. It offers undergraduate courses in arts and sciences. It is affiliated to  Manipur University.

Accreditation
The college is recognized by the University Grants Commission (UGC).

See also
List of institutions of higher education in Manipur

References

External links
https://www.kamakhyapemtoncollege.ac.in/

Colleges affiliated to Manipur University
Educational institutions established in 1973
Universities and colleges in Manipur
1973 establishments in Manipur